Kenfig Hill Rugby Football Club is a rugby union team from the village of Kenfig Hill, South Wales. Kenfig Hill RFC presently play in the Welsh Rugby Union Division one west. The club is a member of the Welsh Rugby Union and is a feeder club for the Ospreys. The club fields a First, Seconds, Youth and Junior teams.

A club was first founded at Kenfig in 1897, though not taking the name Kenfig Hill RFC at the time. In 1914 the club, like many teams in the area, went into liquidation, but reformed after the First World War, playing from Croft Goch Playing Fields.

Kenfig Hill RFC has seen several players progress to represent Wales and the British Lions, including Welsh captain, Jack Bassett.

Club honours
 1973-74 Glamorgan County Silver Ball Trophy, winners.

Notable former players
  Arthur A. Bassett
  Jack Bassett
  Cliff Davies
  Tim Fauvel 
  Eiryn Gwyn Davies
  Raymond Giles 
  Jonathan Humphreys
  Dafydd James
  David Morgan Jenkins dual-code international
  Ned Jenkins (21 caps)
  Phillip John O.B.E
  Alan John Phillips
  Brian Radford
  Aaron Rees 
  Craig Warlow
  Matthew Wintle 
  Richard Wintle

References

Welsh rugby union teams